Izard County  is a county located in the U.S. state of Arkansas. As of the 2020 census, the population was 13,577. The county seat is Melbourne. Izard County is Arkansas's 13th county, formed on October 27, 1825, and named for War of 1812 General and Arkansas Territorial Governor George Izard. It is an alcohol prohibition or dry county.

Geography

Major highways

 Arkansas Highway 5
 Arkansas Highway 9
 Arkansas Highway 56
 Arkansas Highway 58
 Arkansas Highway 69
 Arkansas Highway 69 Business
 Arkansas Highway 177
 Arkansas Highway 223
 Arkansas Highway 289
 Arkansas Highway 354

Adjacent counties
Fulton County (north)
Sharp County (east)
Independence County (southeast)
Stone County (southwest)
Baxter County (northwest)

Demographics

2020 census

As of the 2020 United States census, there were 13,577 people, 4,851 households, and 3,124 families residing in the county.

2000 census
As of the 2000 census, there were 13,249 people, 5,440 households, and 3,769 families residing in the county.  The population density was 23 people per square mile (9/km2).  There were 6,591 housing units at an average density of 11 per square mile (4/km2).  The racial makeup of the county was 96.41% White, 1.44% Black or African American, 0.63% Native American, 0.11% Asian, 0.02% Pacific Islander, 0.26% from other races, and 1.13% from two or more races.  1.00% of the population were Hispanic or Latino of any race.

There were 5,440 households, out of which 25.50% had children under the age of 18 living with them, 58.70% were married couples living together, 7.50% had a female householder with no husband present, and 30.70% were non-families. 27.80% of all households were made up of individuals, and 15.10% had someone living alone who was 65 years of age or older.  The average household size was 2.30 and the average family size was 2.78.

In the county, the population was spread out, with 20.90% under the age of 18, 7.10% from 18 to 24, 25.00% from 25 to 44, 25.80% from 45 to 64, and 21.10% who were 65 years of age or older.  The median age was 43 years. For every 100 females there were 102.90 males.  For every 100 females age 18 and over, there were 100.90 males.

The median income for a household in the county was $25,670, and the median income for a family was $32,313. Males had a median income of $22,389 versus $18,450 for females. The per capita income for the county was $14,397.  About 13.60% of families and 17.20% of the population were below the poverty line, including 22.40% of those under age 18 and 13.70% of those age 65 or over.

Government
Over the past few election cycles Izard County has trended heavily towards the GOP. The last Democrat (as of 2020) to carry this county was Al Gore in 2000.

Communities

Cities
 Calico Rock
 Horseshoe Bend
 Melbourne (county seat)
 Oxford

Towns
 Franklin
 Guion
 Mount Pleasant
 Pineville

Census-designated places 
 Mount Olive
 Violet Hill

Unincorporated communities

 Brockwell
 Dolph
 Forty Four
 Gid
 Jumbo
 LaCrosse
 Lunenburg
 Sage
 Sylamore
 Wideman
 Wiseman
 Zion

Townships

 Athens
 Baker (small parts of Horseshoe Bend and Oxford)
 Barren Fork (part of Mount Pleasant)
 Big Spring
 Bryan
 Claiborne (small part of Calico Rock)
 Drytown (part of Mount Pleasant)
 Franklin (most of Frankln, small part of Horseshoe Bend)
 Gid
 Guion (Guion)
 Guthrie
 Jefferson (most of Horseshoe Bend, small part of Franklin)
 Lacrosse (part of Melbourne)
 Lafferty
 Lunenberg
 Mill Creek (most of Melbourne)
 Mount Olive
 Newburg (small part of Oxford)
 New Hope (most of Oxford)
 Pleasant Hill
 Sage (part of Melbourne)
 Strawberry
 Union (Pineville, most of Calico Rock)
 Violet Hill
 White River

Source:

Notable people
 Terry Shell, lawyer and judge, served as United States federal judge in Arkansas from 1975 to 1978

See also
 List of lakes in Izard County, Arkansas
 National Register of Historic Places listings in Izard County, Arkansas

References

External links

 Map of Izard County from the U. S. Census Bureau

 
1825 establishments in Arkansas Territory
Populated places established in 1825